Typhoon Damrey, known in the Philippines as Typhoon Labuyo, was a typhoon that hit Vietnam and China in September 2005. The typhoon was the most powerful storm to affect Hainan in over 30 years, killing more than 113 people.

Meteorological history

Due to its proximity to the Philippines, PAGASA assigned it the name Labuyo and began issuing advisories to the east of the islands on September 19. The Japan Meteorological Agency gave warnings on the same day. On September 20, the storm was classified as a tropical depression 17W by the Joint Typhoon Warning Center (JTWC). On September 21, the JTWC upgraded it to a tropical storm and assigned it the name Damrey (Khmer: ដំរី; lit.: elephant). Damrey strengthened into a typhoon on September 24.

Damrey made landfall at Wanning, China's Hainan province, at 20:00 UTC on September 25 (04:00 on September 26, local time). It had maximum sustained winds up to 180 km/h. This made Damrey the strongest typhoon to strike Hainan since Typhoon Marge in September 1973. At least 16 people are believed to have died in China, and the entire province of Hainan suffered power outages. Damrey went on to impact Vietnam before losing tropical characteristics.

Preparations
In the Philippines, officials in the province of Ilocos Norte evacuated nearly 20,000 residents from flood-prone regions to schools being used as temporary shelters. In fourteen of the country's provinces, storm signal one, the lowest on a scale of four, was issued by meteorologists.

Impact

Throughout southeastern Asia, Typhoon Damrey was considered one of the worst typhoons in history. Many places sustained damage not seen in several decades. In Hainan Island, the entire province was without power at one point, a highly unusual event. Additionally, Typhoon Damrey became the strongest storm to make landfall on the island since Typhoon Della in 1974. In Vietnam, Damrey was referred to as the worst typhoon to strike the country in nine years.

Philippines
As a tropical storm, Damrey produced significant rainfall across portions of the Philippines. Widespread flash flooding triggered by these rains led to substantial agricultural and property damage. In the agricultural department alone, officials estimated that the storm wrought over 1 billion Philippine pesos (USD 21.4 million) in losses. Over 9,000 hectares (22,239 acres) of rice and corn fields were flooded in Isabela Province alone. Throughout the country, 16 people were killed as a result of flooding, several of whom were children from Isabela Province. Landslides along the major roadway between the provinces of Ilocos Norte and Cagayan were impassable, due to landslides and downed trees. Farther west, 35 villages were flooded in the provinces of Camarines Sur and Albay.

Vietnam
Throughout Vietnam, up to 68 people were killed as a result of the typhoon. Damage from the storm was estimated at nearly 3.3 trillion Vietnamese dongs (USD 208.9 million). The most severe damage took place in northern Yen Bai province, where 51 people were either killed or missing. Roughly  of dykes built to protect farmland from flooding were destroyed by the typhoon. More than 10,400 homes and schools were destroyed by floodwaters, leaving tens of thousands of people homeless.

Laos and Thailand
After moving through Vietnam, the former typhoon brought heavy rainfall to parts of Laos which triggered widespread flash flooding. Throughout the country, 55 people were killed as a result of the storm. In northern Thailand, the remnants of Damrey produced widespread flooding that killed ten people and left three others missing. The most severe damage took place in Lampang province, where seven people were killed and one other was missing. Nearly 2,000 people were evacuated due to flooding which caused damage to an estimated 32,000 homes. In addition to the thousands of damaged homes, 40 roads, 24 bridges, and a reservoir were also damaged. Elsewhere in Thailand, three people were killed as a result of Damrey.

Aftermath
Shortly after the storm passed by the Philippines, officials quickly began search-and-rescue operations in the hardest-hit regions. Personnel from the 501st Brigade of the Philippine Coast Guard led the rescue efforts in Ilocos Norte. Food, water, and supplies were being delivered to evacuation centers to care for evacuees and victims. In the wake of the storm, the governor of Aurora Province requested government assistance for residents in central areas of the province. By September 21, the Philippine Navy deployed rescue personnel to the area. Additionally, the National Disaster Coordinating Council and the Department of Social Welfare and Development provided medical supplies and relief items to the affected areas.

See also 

 Typhoon Marge (1973)
 Tropical Storm Kompasu (2021)

References

External links

 JMA General Information of Typhoon Damrey (0518) from Digital Typhoon

Damrey_(2005)
2005 Pacific typhoon season
Typhoons in Vietnam
History of Hainan